Emilio Ballado Alvarado (born 2 May 1916) is a Mexican former boxer who represented his native country in the 1935 Central American and Caribbean Games and in the 1936 Summer Olympics.

Amateur career
In the 1935 Central American and Caribbean Games, staged in San Salvador, El Salvador, Ballado won the gold medal in the welterweight class —— against Panamanian pugilist Alberto Allan. One year later, in the 1936 Summer Olympics celebrated in Berlin, Germany, he was eliminated in the first round of the welterweight class after losing his fight to Norwegian pugilist Rudolf Andreassen.

Boxing record 

| style="text-align:center;" colspan="8"|0 Wins, 1 Lost (1 knockouts), 1 Draw
|-  style="text-align:center; background:#e3e3e3;"
|  style="border-style:none none solid solid; "|Res.
|  style="border-style:none none solid solid; "|Record
|  style="border-style:none none solid solid; "|Opponent
|  style="border-style:none none solid solid; "|Type
|  style="border-style:none none solid solid; "|Rd., Time
|  style="border-style:none none solid solid; "|Date
|  style="border-style:none none solid solid; "|Location
|  style="border-style:none none solid solid; "|Notes
|- align=center
|||0-1-1
|align=left| Eddie Cerda
|
|
|
|align=left| 
|align=left|
|- align=center
|||0-0-1
|align=left| Frankie Zavalza
|
|
|
|align=left|
|align=left|
|- align=center
|
|
|align=left| Rafael Nava
|
|
|
|align=left| 
|align=left|

References

External links

1916 births
Possibly living people
Mexican male boxers
Welterweight boxers
Olympic boxers of Mexico
Boxers at the 1936 Summer Olympics
Central American and Caribbean Games gold medalists for Mexico
Competitors at the 1935 Central American and Caribbean Games
Central American and Caribbean Games medalists in boxing